Parliamentary elections were held in North Korea on 3 August 2003. Representatives were elected for five-year terms to all 687 seats of the Supreme People's Assembly, and also to 26,650 positions in city, county, and provincial People's Assemblies. All candidates were members of the three parties constituting the Democratic Front for the Reunification of the Fatherland.

Most polling booths featured posters saying: "Let's participate in the voting for deputies to the People's Assembly and give our support to them!".

There was a 99.9% turnout for the election with each candidate receiving 100% of the vote unopposed.

In its first session, on 3 September, the newly elected parliament re-elected Kim Jong-il as the Chairman of the National Defence Commission.

Significance of the number 649 in North Korean politics
Kim Jong-il's seat was the 649th seat, and in North Korea, political meanings are imparted to numbers of the constituencies for cult of personality purposes. According to North Korean sources, multiplying 6, 4 and 9 gives the number 216, which coincides with Kim Jong-il's birthday, February 16th, and 4 times 9 plus 2 gives the number 42, which coincides with Kim Jong-il's official birth year, 1942.

Results

Elected members
The following were elected as members of parliament:

 Electoral District: Ri Ul-sol
 Electoral District: Ryu Mi-yong
 Electoral District: Kim Kyong-hui
 Electoral District: Kim Bok-nam
 Electoral District: Kang Jun-ho
 Electoral District: Kim Yong-nam
 Electoral District: Kim Yong-bok
 Electoral District: Ryu Chung-ryol
 Electoral District: Jang Song-thaek
 Electoral District: Ri Je-kang
 Electoral District: Hong So-hon
 Electoral District: Ri Sun-im
 Electoral District: Sin Song-bo
 Electoral District: Yu Il-ung
 Electoral District: O I-jong
 Electoral District: Kim Jong-ho
 Electoral District: Ri Kyong-il
 Electoral District: Yun Sok-chon
 Electoral District: Chon Kyong-su
 Electoral District: Hwang Kil-chol
 Electoral District: Choe Chang-ae
 Electoral District: Kim Hi-thaek
 Electoral District: Pae Yong-kyu
 Electoral District: Kwak Sang-sik
 Electoral District: Kim Song-hi
 Electoral District: Ho Jong-suk
 Electoral District: Cho Myong-rok
 Electoral District: Ri Un-kuk
 Electoral District: Ri Myong-ok
 Electoral District: Kang Sok-chu
 Electoral District: Omsung Kun
 Electoral District: Ryang Man-kil
 Electoral District: 
 Electoral District: Kim Tong-un
 Electoral District: Pak Song-chol
 Electoral District: Paek Hak-rim
 Electoral District: Kim In-nam
 Electoral District: Kim Yong-chun
 Electoral District: O Ik-je
 Electoral District: Pak Kwan-o
 Electoral District: Kim Kwang-chol
 Electoral District: Kim Ik-hyon
 Electoral District: Paek Yong-chon
 Electoral District: Kim Hwa-suk
 Electoral District: Ri Hwa-sil
 Electoral District: Kang Nam-ik
 Electoral District: Song Chun-sik
 Electoral District: Ri Tong-chan
 Electoral District: Jong Myong-ok
 Electoral District: Kim Il-chol
 Electoral District: Hong Song-nam
 Electoral District: Kim Song-hui
 Electoral District: Pak Pong-nam
 Electoral District: Kim Bok-sil
 Electoral District: Im Man-sun
 Electoral District: Chang Tok-yong
 Electoral District: Mun Sok-bul
 Electoral District: Ri Sung-ho
 Electoral District: Kim Se-myong
 Electoral District: Kim Ho-je
 Electoral District: Kim Jung-rin
 Electoral District: Kang Kwang-su
 Electoral District: Ri Kyong-chol
 Electoral District: Sin Il-nam
 Electoral District: Mun Sang-min
 Electoral District: Cho Yun-je
 Electoral District: Ri Ung-chan
 Electoral District: Han Jae-rok
 Electoral District: Ri Jong-rok
 Electoral District: Kim Chol-man
 Electoral District: Hui Yong-ae
 Electoral District: Kim Yong-chu
 Electoral District: Ri Yong-yong
 Electoral District: Ho Tuk-nam
 Electoral District: No Kwang-chol
 Electoral District: Kim Yun-hyok
 Electoral District: Yun Ki-jong
 Electoral District: Choe Hong-il
 Electoral District: Ko In-ho
 Electoral District: Yomchang Ryong
 Electoral District: Kim Kuk-thae
 Electoral District: Pyon Yong-reeb
 Electoral District: Ri Kwang-ho
 Electoral District: An Myong-ok
 Electoral District: Chang Chol
 Electoral District: Kim Yong-dae
 Electoral District: So Chu-jong
 Electoral District: Hwang Sun-hui
 Electoral District: Choe Thae-bok
 Electoral District: Kim Pong-sil
 Electoral District: Cho Chang-tok
 Electoral District: An In-kon
 Electoral District: Ri Pong-su
 Electoral District: Kim Myong-yun
 Electoral District: Kye Yong-sam
 Electoral District: Ro Pong-ho
 Electoral District: Kim Ki-nam
 Electoral District: Kang Sun-hui
 Electoral District: Han Jong-hwa
 Electoral District: Jong Ha-chol
 Electoral District: Kim Ung-chol
 Electoral District: Ri U-ho
 Electoral District: Chae Hui-jong
 Electoral District: Jong Wan-ik
 Electoral District: Ri Yong-mu
 Electoral District: Choe Punhui
 Electoral District: Kim Yong-kil
 Electoral District: Ri Yong-chol
 Electoral District: Choe Ryong-ik
 Electoral District: Kang Il-kwan
 Electoral District: Chu Tong-il
 Electoral District: Ri Kil-song
 Electoral District: Kang Kwan-chu
 Electoral District: Yu Pom-sun
 Electoral District: Choe Ung-kwon
 Electoral District: Kim Jong-kak
 Electoral District: Paek Song-nam
 Electoral District: Ri Mu-yong
 Electoral District: Kim Kum-suk
 Electoral District: Ri Jae-hang
 Electoral District: Jong Yong-hyok
 Electoral District: Pak Thae-hwa
 Electoral District: Song Ho-kyong
 Electoral District: Kim Sun-hwa
 Electoral District: Chon Yong-sik
 Electoral District: Kim Bok-sin
 Electoral District: Kang Yong-sob
 Electoral District: Ri Chang-won
 Electoral District: Kim Sun-jib
 Electoral District: Ra Song-hwan
 Electoral District: Won Jong-sam
 Electoral District: Ri Kum-pom
 Electoral District: Rim Kyong-suk
 Electoral District: Chang Song-u
 Electoral District: Kim Ok-ryon
 Electoral District: O Myong-il
 Electoral District: Rim Sang-jong
 Electoral District: Kang Pu-phil
 Electoral District: Chi Jae-ryong
 Electoral District: Mun Myong-hak
 Electoral District: Yang Man-sik
 Electoral District: Pak Tong-sok
 Electoral District: Kim Yu-pong
 Electoral District: So Pyong-bok
 Electoral District: Ri Hi-il
 Electoral District: Ryo Won-ku
 Electoral District: Pak Yun-kon
 Electoral District: Sin Ung-sik
 Electoral District: Kim Tu-ik
 Electoral District: Kim Yon-hwa
 Electoral District: Kang Hyong-pong
 Electoral District: Chon Jae-rok
 Electoral District: Choe Sung-chol
 Electoral District: Chang Pyong-thae
 Electoral District: Kim Myong-hui
 Electoral District: Choe Yong
 Electoral District: Choe Jong-ryul
 Electoral District: Ham Jong-kon
 Electoral District: Han Kwang-bok
 Electoral District: Kang Yong-thae
 Electoral District: Jong Mun-son
 Electoral District: Pak Yong-hun
 Electoral District: Cho Tae-ha
 Electoral District: Ra Yong-ran
 Electoral District: Son Sok-kun
 Electoral District: Kim Ryo-su
 Electoral District: Kim Jae-hwa
 Electoral District: Kwon Hyon-suk
 Electoral District: Kim Jun-kol
 Electoral District: Choe Song-won
 Electoral District: Kang Chol-won
 Electoral District: Chon Kum-chin
 Electoral District: Ri Chu-o
 Electoral District: Chang Ung
 Electoral District: Kim Ryong-kun
 Electoral District: Kim Jong-kil
 Electoral District: Ryu Jae-myong
 Electoral District: Pak Yong-sok
 Electoral District: Ri Pong-ik
 Electoral District: Jong Jae-sik
 Electoral District: Kim Yong-sun
 Electoral District: Ri Yong-kon
 Electoral District: Kim Hui-sam
 Electoral District: Kwak Chol-ho
 Electoral District: Ho Hwan-chol
 Electoral District: Choe Yong-tok
 Electoral District: Hong Son-ok
 Electoral District: Sin Thae-uk
 Electoral District: An Chang-ryon
 Electoral District: Han Un-kuk
 Electoral District: Han Pyong-man
 Electoral District: Kim Pong-su
 Electoral District: Cho Kang-chol
 Electoral District: Kim Mu-chon
 Electoral District: Kim Chang-su
 Electoral District: Ri Kwang-kun
 Electoral District: Pak Myong-hun
 Electoral District: Pyon Tok-sang
 Electoral District: Kim Yong-sam
 Electoral District: Kim Yang-kon
 Electoral District: Choe Hu-yong
 Electoral District: Kim Ik-chol
 Electoral District: Choe Kwang-chol
 Electoral District: Chon Kyong-son
 Electoral District: Kim In-sun
 Electoral District: Kim Hak-chol
 Electoral District: Rim Tong-ok
 Electoral District: Jong Yong-chol
 Electoral District: Pak Yong-kil
 Electoral District: Mun Jae-chol
 Electoral District: Kim Phyong-hae
 Electoral District: Paek Bok-nam
 Electoral District: Pak Sun-hui
 Electoral District: Son Kyong-nam
 Electoral District: Chang Jae-on
 Electoral District: Ri Sang-ryong
 Electoral District: Chang Chol
 Electoral District: Mun Hak-jun
 Electoral District: Pak Kyong-sam
 Electoral District: Ri Su-yong
 Electoral District: Chang Chin-kon
 Electoral District: So Chun-yong
 Electoral District: Song Kwang-chol
 Electoral District: Kim Hui-son
 Electoral District: Kim Yong-jae
 Electoral District: Cho Jong-rim
 Electoral District: Yun Tong-hyon
 Electoral District: O Sun-yong
 Electoral District: Kim Tok-il
 Electoral District: Ri Won-chol
 Electoral District: Kim Ki-ryong
 Electoral District: Kim Pong-il
 Electoral District: Pak Song-sil
 Electoral District: Son Un-song
 Electoral District: Ri Kyong-pom
 Electoral District: Hyon Won-kuk
 Electoral District: Jong Son-mun
 Electoral District: Cha Myong-ok
 Electoral District: Chon Ho-chol
 Electoral District: Mun Pyong-kum
 Electoral District: An Yong-hyon
 Electoral District: Han Pong-un
 Electoral District: Ri Hong-sob
 Electoral District: Ri Tuk-nam
 Electoral District: Kim Su-cho
 Electoral District: Paek Se-pong
 Electoral District: Kwak Yong-nam
 Electoral District: Pyon Thae-jun
 Electoral District: Kim Hye-ran
 Electoral District: Kim In-suk
 Electoral District: O Su-yong
 Electoral District: Kim Yong-jong
 Electoral District: Pak Song
 Electoral District: Ri Sang-mu
 Electoral District: Kim Tae-sun
 Electoral District: Yon Hyong-muk
 Electoral District: Kang Won-jung
 Electoral District: Jong Sung-jae
 Electoral District: Han Song-kyu
 Electoral District: Jong Chun-sil
 Electoral District: Kim Tong-un
 Electoral District: Ryom Hui-ryong
 Electoral District: Sin Kwan-chin
 Electoral District: Chu Kyu-chang
 Electoral District: Ro Hae-sun
 Electoral District: Kim Chae-ran
 Electoral District: Kim Sun-yong
 Electoral District: Kang Hye-suk
 Electoral District: Pak Song-ok
 Electoral District: Ryom In-yun
 Electoral District: Kim Tong-son
 Electoral District: Ri Chun-ku
 Electoral District: Kim In-nam
 Electoral District: Choe Ki-ryong
 Electoral District: Kim Chi-tok
 Electoral District: Ri Tan
 Electoral District: Ryang Kyong-bok
 Electoral District: Cho Kyong-chol
 Electoral District: Ri Jong-suk
 Electoral District: Choe Hui-jong
 Electoral District: Choe Kyong-sul
 Electoral District: Ho Jong-man
 Electoral District: Hwang Yun-nam
 Electoral District: Sung Sang-sob
 Electoral District: Chi Sang-man
 Electoral District: Ro Ik-hwa
 Electoral District: Ho Nam-sun
 Electoral District: Kim Chun-nyo
 Electoral District: Kye Ung-thae
 Electoral District: Ri Jong-son
 Electoral District: Kim Il-ho
 Electoral District: Ri Sang-chu
 Electoral District: Hwang Sun-hui
 Electoral District: An Sung-ok
 Electoral District: Cho Kyu-il
 Electoral District: Choe Su-hon
 Electoral District: Kang Kil-yong
 Electoral District: Paek Nam-il
 Electoral District: Ri Jun-hui
 Electoral District: Song Hyo-nam
 Electoral District: Won Chang-ryong
 Electoral District: Pak Jong-chin
 Electoral District: Ri Chol
 Electoral District: Ri Jong-suk
 Electoral District: Kim Pyong-hwa
 Electoral District: Ri Jong-kuk
 Electoral District: Choe Chil-nam
 Electoral District: Jong Ok-tong
 Electoral District: Ri Myong-chol
 Electoral District: Kim Jong
 Electoral District: Choe Chin-su
 Electoral District: So Pung-kun
 Electoral District: Kim Pyong-ryul
 Electoral District: Chu Chin-ku
 Electoral District: An Min-chol
 Electoral District: Choe Jong-kon
 Electoral District: So Sung-chol
 Electoral District: Thae Hyong-chol
 Electoral District: Ham Song-to
 Electoral District: Choe Su-il
 Electoral District: Kim Pyong-hwan
 Electoral District: Hong Kye-sik
 Electoral District: Kwon Chun-hak
 Electoral District: Hwang Hwi-sang
 Electoral District: O Ung-chang
 Electoral District: Mun Pyong-rok
 Electoral District: Ri Kyong-sik
 Electoral District: Ri Man-song
 Electoral District: An Chun-sob
 Electoral District: Kim Hwa-sun
 Electoral District: Kim Ok-kyu
 Electoral District: O Yong-chun
 Electoral District: Pak Hui-tok
 Electoral District: Kang Ryon-hak
 Electoral District: Ri Thae-sik
 Electoral District: Kim Un-ki
 Electoral District: Kim Sung-ok
 Electoral District: Choe Nam-kyun
 Electoral District: Kim Pyong-hun
 Electoral District: Pak Ui-chun
 Electoral District: Kim Yong-sun
 Electoral District: Song Yun-hui
 Electoral District: Paek Sol
 Electoral District: Chang Myong-sil
 Electoral District: Choe Jong-son
 Electoral District: Mun Kyong-tok
 Electoral District: Cho Hye-suk
 Electoral District: Han Song-ryong
 Electoral District: Pak Jae-phil
 Electoral District: Ri Hi-hon
 Electoral District: Ri Kyong-il
 Electoral District: Pak Tok-kwan
 Electoral District: Ko Kyu-il
 Electoral District: Kim Ryong-yon
 Electoral District: Ra Chang-ryol
 Electoral District: Song Sung-cho
 Electoral District: Choe Yong-son
 Electoral District: Pak Chol-hoe
 Electoral District: Kim Yong-ae
 Electoral District: Chae Kang-hwan
 Electoral District: O Kuk-ryol
 Electoral District: Kim Tok-jung
 Electoral District: Yun Chol
 Electoral District: Mun Il-pong
 Electoral District: Kim Jong-ok
 Electoral District: Sin Hyon-kwang
 Electoral District: Yang Hyong-sob
 Electoral District: Ko Jong-ik
 Electoral District: Ro Pae-kwon
 Electoral District: Paek Nam-sun
 Electoral District: Ri Jong-sik
 Electoral District: Won Tong-ku
 Electoral District: Chu Ki-chan
 Electoral District: Kim Song-ung
 Electoral District: Pak Kwang-cho
 Electoral District: Kim Si-hak
 Electoral District: Hwang Sang-kwon
 Electoral District: Kim Socha
 Electoral District: Pak Myong-sik
 Electoral District: Pak Nam-chol
 Electoral District: Pong Chan-ho
 Electoral District: Kim Jong-rok
 Electoral District: Ri Chol-ho
 Electoral District: Ro Tu-chol
 Electoral District: Choe Kwang-chol
 Electoral District: Pak Chang-ryon
 Electoral District: An Kyong-ho
 Electoral District: Kim Il-kun
 Electoral District: Pae Tal-jun
 Electoral District: Ri Chan-bok
 Electoral District: Kim Ryong-song
 Electoral District: Ri Kyo-sang
 Electoral District: Kim Myong-kol
 Electoral District: Kim Chi-won
 Electoral District: Kim Pyong-song
 Electoral District: Ri Kuk-su
 Electoral District: Kim Yu-ho
 Electoral District: Kim Won-il
 Electoral District: Jong Ki-hun
 Electoral District: So Man-sul
 Electoral District: Hong Jong-ku
 Electoral District: Han Won-il
 Electoral District: Hong Sok-chin
 Electoral District: Ri Yong-su
 Electoral District: Ryu Kum-ryol
 Electoral District: Kim Chin-kyu
 Electoral District: Sok Kyong-su
 Electoral District: U Tu-thae
 Electoral District: Kim Jong-sim
 Electoral District: Kim Yong-sik
 Electoral District: Jong Song-ok
 Electoral District: Son Kum-wol
 Electoral District: Sin Pyong-chol
 Electoral District: Ri Yong-son
 Electoral District: So Sok-yun
 Electoral District: Chon Son-ung
 Electoral District: Kim In-bok
 Electoral District: Ri Jong-hyok
 Electoral District: O Kwang-chol
 Electoral District: Jong Pyong-sang
 Electoral District: Sim Sang-tae
 Electoral District: Pyon Ryong-se
 Electoral District: Son Sam-sul
 Electoral District: Han Su-man
 Electoral District: Kim Hong-su
 Electoral District: Kim Ki-u
 Electoral District: Mun Yong-chol
 Electoral District: Kim Sung-yon
 Electoral District: Ko Jong-tok
 Electoral District: Chi Yong-chun
 Electoral District: Ri Hwan-ki
 Electoral District: Kang Nung-su
 Electoral District: Pak Jung-kun
 Electoral District: Sin Tae-kyun
 Electoral District: Kwon Isun
 Electoral District: Hwang Yong-sam
 Electoral District: Kim Je-tong
 Electoral District: Ri Mun-yong
 Electoral District: Pak Sam-ho
 Electoral District: Ri Kwang-nam
 Electoral District: Choe Kwan-yong
 Electoral District: Ri Jong-mu
 Electoral District: Ri Chol-pong
 Electoral District: Jong Mun-su
 Electoral District: Ri Chang-han
 Electoral District: Chon Hye-song
 Electoral District: Ri Won-il
 Electoral District: Chon Tae-won
 Electoral District: Choe In-ho
 Electoral District: Ko Son-ok
 Electoral District: Nam Chin-hi
 Electoral District: Han Chang-bin
 Electoral District: Han Jae-myong
 Electoral District: Kang Tok-su
 Electoral District: Cha Kyong-il
 Electoral District: Pak Myong-chol
 Electoral District: Kim Yang-jom
 Electoral District: Ho Yong-chun
 Electoral District: Son Hyon-nam
 Electoral District: Song Chun-sob
 Electoral District: Ri Song-ung
 Electoral District: Ri Ho-rim
 Electoral District: Ri Je-son
 Electoral District: Ryom Sun-kil
 Electoral District: Kim Hwa-wol
 Electoral District: Chu Yong-suk
 Electoral District: Pak Song-il
 Electoral District: Kim Yong-kuk
 Electoral District: Kim Yang-kun
 Electoral District: Pak Pong-chu
 Electoral District: Sin An-son
 Electoral District: Cho Pyong-chu
 Electoral District: Jong Pyong-kon
 Electoral District: U Won-sok
 Electoral District: Ho Hak
 Electoral District: Chang Myong-hak
 Electoral District: Kim Jong-yong
 Electoral District: Han U-chol
 Electoral District: Ri Chu-ok
 Electoral District: Ryu Kyong-ok
 Electoral District: Ri Hyo-son
 Electoral District: Yu Kyong-suk
 Electoral District: Pak In-chu
 Electoral District: Sin Song-u
 Electoral District: Han Hui-hwan
 Electoral District: Kim Man-sang
 Electoral District: Kim Su-hak
 Electoral District: Mun Yong-son
 Electoral District: Tong Yong-il
 Electoral District: Chon Chol-ku
 Electoral District: Ri Ui-hyon
 Electoral District: Ri Yong-ae
 Electoral District: Chi Ki-son
 Electoral District: Kim Sung-nam
 Electoral District: Cha Sung-su
 Electoral District: Kim Song-tok
 Electoral District: Pak Mun-sik
 Electoral District: Han Chu-hwan
 Electoral District: Chang Yong-kol
 Electoral District: Kim Pung-ki
 Electoral District: Chang Tong-un
 Electoral District: Kim Yong-kol
 Electoral District: Pak Ik-tong
 Electoral District: Pak Nam-gi
 Electoral District: O Ki-sok
 Electoral District: Ri Yong-suk
 Electoral District: Ryang Su-jong
 Electoral District: Kang Thae-mu
 Electoral District: Hwang Jae-kyong
 Electoral District: Kim Wan-su
 Electoral District: Ri Thae-nam
 Electoral District: Kim Jae-kwon
 Electoral District: Chang Sun-kum
 Electoral District: U Tong-chuk
 Electoral District: Hong Sa-yon
 Electoral District: Kim Song-hun
 Electoral District: Chon Kyong-nam
 Electoral District: Kim Kyu-hun
 Electoral District: Pak Song-su
 Electoral District: Phil Yong-kun
 Electoral District: Chang Il-son
 Electoral District: Pak Kil-yon
 Electoral District: Kim Pong-sik
 Electoral District: Pak Song-chun
 Electoral District: Song Jun-thaek
 Electoral District: Ko Jong-sik
 Electoral District: Hwang Pong-yong
 Electoral District: Chang Son-ok
 Electoral District: Nam Song-rok
 Electoral District: Hwang Ok-son
 Electoral District: Cho Myong-yong
 Electoral District: Cho Yun-hui
 Electoral District: Kim Chang-kyu
 Electoral District: Ko chung ho
 Electoral District: Sin Tong-son
 Electoral District: Kim Kye-kwan
 Electoral District: Kim Tu-nam
 Electoral District: Kim Kyong-ho
 Electoral District: Song Sun-nyo
 Electoral District: Ho Han-ryong
 Electoral District: Kim Yong-chin
 Electoral District: Choe Kwan-jun
 Electoral District: Ri Ho
 Electoral District: Ri Jong-sik
 Electoral District: Kim Chun-kum
 Electoral District: Hong Sok-hyong
 Electoral District: Thae Chang-hon
 Electoral District: Ko Ki-hun
 Electoral District: Tong Hun
 Electoral District: Chon Sung-hun
 Electoral District: Chu Chun-sob
 Electoral District: Han Hung-phyo
 Electoral District: Kim Min-suk
 Electoral District: Chon Song-ho
 Electoral District: Thae Son-hui
 Electoral District: Kim Hyong-chan
 Electoral District: Song Kum-ok
 Electoral District: Chon Pyong-sob
 Electoral District: Kim Won-bok
 Electoral District: Kim Thae-pong
 Electoral District: Choe Kil-chu
 Electoral District: Phyo Il-sok
 Electoral District: Song Ryong-su
 Electoral District: Kim Ui-sun
 Electoral District: Kim Tong-il
 Electoral District: Song Jong-hui
 Electoral District: Pak Su-kil
 Electoral District: Ri Kwi-ok
 Electoral District: Ri Sang-chol
 Electoral District: Ri Thae-il
 Electoral District: Kim Song-jong
 Electoral District: Han Chi-sol
 Electoral District: Jong Chan-kyong
 Electoral District: Sok Kil-ho
 Electoral District: Rim Yong-chol
 Electoral District: Pak Kwang-chol
 Electoral District: Pak Myong-hun
 Electoral District: Jong Yong-son
 Electoral District: Choe Yong-ho
 Electoral District: Kim Su-yol
 Electoral District: Pak Chang-sik
 Electoral District: Hong Rin-sob
 Electoral District: Chon Kwang-rok
 Electoral District: Chang In-suk
 Electoral District: Chu Sun-ok
 Electoral District: Chang Yong-sok
 Electoral District: Rim Juk-son
 Electoral District: Ri Il-nam
 Electoral District: Pak Chol-ho
 Electoral District: Kim Myong-hui
 Electoral District: Ri Pong-juk
 Electoral District: Han Myong-kuk
 Electoral District: Kim Hyong-tok
 Electoral District: Choe Chun-hwang
 Electoral District: Pak Kun-su
 Electoral District: Cha Yong-chol
 Electoral District: Choe Ki-jun
 Electoral District: Ri Kong-phil
 Electoral District: Choe Tok-chu
 Electoral District: Yon Thae-jong
 Electoral District: Kim Kyong-ho
 Electoral District: Song Jong-su
 Electoral District: Ri Hyon-sob
 Electoral District: Kim Yong-il
 Electoral District: Pak Kil-man
 Electoral District: Kim Tong-kyu
 Electoral District: Kim Tong-hyob
 Electoral District: Ri Yong-bok
 Electoral District: Kim Tuk-sam
 Electoral District: Jong Un-op
 Electoral District: Ri Ho-hyon
 Electoral District: Kim Yong-il
 Electoral District: O Se-in
 Electoral District: Jong Myong-cho
 Electoral District: Ri Hye-chol
 Electoral District: Ko Myong-hui
 Electoral District: Kim Su-tok
 Electoral District: Chon Pyong-ho
 Electoral District: Kwak Pom-ki
 Electoral District: Kim Hyong-nam
 Electoral District: Mun Ung-cho
 Electoral District: Kil Chol-hyok
 Electoral District: Kim Tok-hun
 Electoral District: Kim Jong-suk
 Electoral District: Rim Myong-hwan
 Electoral District: Im Jong-sil
 Electoral District: Cho Hui-kon
 Electoral District: Kim Yun-sim
 Electoral District: Choe Jun-kil
 Electoral District: Han Sung-ro
 Electoral District: O Kum-chol
 Electoral District: Cha Jun-sik
 Electoral District: Ri Pyong-chol
 Electoral District: Han Tu-hyon
 Electoral District: Kim Ki-son
 Electoral District: Ri Chun-il
 Electoral District: Kim Sung-yon
 Electoral District: Pak Jae-kyong
 Electoral District: Ryo Chun-sok
 Electoral District: Pang Chang-tok
 Electoral District: Kim Sang-ik
 Electoral District: Ri Yong-kil
 Electoral District: Hyon Chol-hae
 Electoral District: Ri Won-jong
 Electoral District: Ri Si-jung
 Electoral District: Kim Won-hong
 Electoral District: Ri Ho
 Electoral District: Choe Hyong-kwan
 Electoral District: Kim Jong-il
 Electoral District: Ri Hyong-ryong
 Electoral District: Jong Ho-kyun
 Electoral District: Chon Chin-su
 Electoral District: Pak Chang-kon
 Electoral District: Kim Mun-jong
 Electoral District: Pyon In-son
 Electoral District: Chang Yong-pong
 Electoral District: Kim Ryong-un
 Electoral District: Chu Sun-chol
 Electoral District: Kim Hyong-ryong
 Electoral District: Chon Jae-kwon
 Electoral District: Kim Jong-hyon
 Electoral District: Kim Ul-yong
 Electoral District: Ri Myong-su
 Electoral District: Nam Sang-rak
 Electoral District: Ryom Yong-hi
 Electoral District: Ri Yong-ho
 Electoral District: Pak Won-sik
 Electoral District: Jong Myong-to
 Electoral District: Pak Yong-sik
 Electoral District: Ri Thae-pong
 Electoral District: Ho Song-il
 Electoral District: Sin Kum-yon
 Electoral District: Jong Chang-ryol
 Electoral District: Pak Yun-hwal
 Electoral District: Ri Pyong-sam
 Electoral District: Chon Chang-bok
 Electoral District: Yun Jong-rin
 Electoral District: Kim Kum-son
 Electoral District: Ri Kuk-jun
 Electoral District: Kim Chang-sob
 Electoral District: Kim Sung-pom
 Electoral District: Choe Ryong-su
 Electoral District: Sim Won-il
 Electoral District: Ri Mu-ung
 Electoral District: Kim Jong-nam
 Electoral District: Ro Kyong-jun
 Electoral District: Pak In-yong

References

Elections in North Korea
Parliamentary
North Korea
Supreme People's Assembly
Election and referendum articles with incomplete results